Mon Yazawin (also spelled Mun Yazawin), translated from Mon into Burmese by Shwe Naw, is a chronicle about the Hanthawaddy Kingdom as well as of earlier Mon polities. It is one of the two extant chronicles named "Mon Yazawin" (or "Mun Yazawin").

Provenance
There are two known extant chronicles with the Burmese language name of မွန်ရာဇဝင် (Mon Yazawin). The subject of this article refers to the work, first machine published in 1922.

According to J.A. Stewart, the source of the 1922 publication, whose title he transliterated as Mun Yazawin, was a 19th-century compilation (and translation into Burmese) of older Mon language manuscripts by one U Shwe Naw. Stewart continued that the reference Mon manuscripts were actually those collected by Sir Arthur Purves Phayre from Siam; and that Shwe Naw's Burmese language manuscript was found at the Mingun Pitaka Taik (Mingun Library) at Sagaing. According to Michael Aung-Thwin who followed up on Stewart's statement, the only Mon language history manuscript found in the Sir Arthur Phayre Collection in the British Library is a palm-leaf manuscript, cataloged as History of the Talaings. Furthermore, the epilogue section of the 1922 publication states that the manuscript—presumably the Mon language manuscript Phayre collected—was completed on the 6th waning of Tabodwe 1146 ME (30 January 1785).

Subject matter
The chronicle mainly covers the history of Martaban–Pegu monarchs from Wareru to Takayutpi. It also contains brief early histories of the Thuwunnabhumi and Hanthawaddy kingdoms. The chronicle's chronology is highly unreliable. Not only are many of its dates wildly divergent from other chronicles' dates for the same events, but the dates in different sections of the chronicle do not agree with one another.

The following table is a summary of the monarchs of the Wareru dynasty as reported in the chronicle.

Notes

References

Bibliography
 
 
 

Burmese chronicles
History of Myanmar
1785 non-fiction books